The 1810–11 United States House of Representatives elections were held on various dates in various states between April 24, 1810 and August 2, 1811. Each state set its own date for its elections to the House of Representatives before the first session of the 12th United States Congress convened on November 4, 1811. They occurred during President James Madison's first term. Elections were held for all 142 seats, representing 17 states.

One newly elected Representative, Henry Clay, also was elected Speaker.

With the repeal of the Embargo Act of 1807, the economy improved.  The opposition Federalists lost voter support and the Democratic-Republicans recovered a supermajority.

Election summaries

Special elections 

There were special elections in 1810 and 1811 to the 11th United States Congress and 12th United States Congress.

Elections are sorted by date then district.

11th Congress 

|-
! 
| William Denning
|  | Democratic-Republican
| 1808
|  | Incumbent resigned in 1810.New member elected April 24–26, 1810.Democratic-Republican hold.Successor seated December 4, 1810.Successor also elected the same day to the next term, see below.
| nowrap | 

|-
! 
| Benjamin Howard
|  | Democratic-Republican
| 1806
|  | Incumbent resigned April 10, 1810 to become Governor of Louisiana Territory.New member elected August 6, 1810.Democratic-Republican hold.Successor seated December 13, 1810.Successor did not run to the next term, see below.
| nowrap | 

|-
! 
| Samuel W. Dana
|  | Federalist
| 1796 
|  | Incumbent resigned in May 1810 after election as U.S. senator.New member elected September 17, 1810.Federalist hold.Successor seated December 3, 1810.Successor lost election to the next term, see below.
| nowrap | 

|-
! 
| Roger Nelson
|  | Democratic-Republican
| 1804 
|  | Incumbent resigned May 14, 1810 to become associate judge of the fifth judicial circuit of Maryland.New member elected October 1, 1810.Democratic-Republican hold.Successor seated December 7, 1810.Successor also elected the same day to the next term, see below.
| nowrap | 

|-
! 
| Jabez Upham
|  | Federalist
| 1806
|  | Incumbent resigned in 1810.New member elected October 8, 1810.Federalist hold.Successor seated December 13, 1810.Successor did not run to the next term, see below.
| nowrap | 

|-
! 
| William Stedman
|  | Federalist
| 1803
|  | Incumbent resigned July 16, 1810 to become Clerk of Courts for Worcester County.New member elected October 8, 1810.Federalist hold.Successor seated December 14, 1810.Successor later elected to the next term, see below.
| nowrap | 

|-
! 
| James Cox
|  | Democratic-Republican
| 1810
|  | Incumbent died September 12, 1810.New member elected October 30–31, 1810.Democratic-Republican hold.Successor seated December 3, 1810.Successor did not run to the next term, see below.
| nowrap | 

|-
! 
| John G. Jackson
|  | Democratic-Republican
| 1803
|  | Incumbent resigned September 28, 1810 after being wounded in a duel.New member elected November 1810.Democratic-Republican hold.Successor seated December 21, 1810.Successor late lost election to the next term, see below.
| nowrap | 

|-
! 
| John Brown
|  | Democratic-Republican
| 1808
|  | Incumbent resigned in 1810 to become clerk of the county court of Queen Anne's County.New member elected November 15, 1810.Democratic-Republican hold.Successor seated December 3, 1810.New member was also elected by the same ballot to the next term, see below.
| nowrap | 

|-
! 
| Robert Marion
|  | Democratic-Republican
| 1804
|  | Incumbent resigned December 4, 1810, having already retired.New member elected December 31, 1810.Democratic-Republican hold.Successor seated January 24, 1811. Successor had already been elected to the next term, see below.
| nowrap | 

|}

12th Congress 

|-
! 
| John Brown
|  | Democratic-Republican
| 1808
|  | Representative-elect declined to serve to become clerk of the county court of Queen Anne's County.New member elected November 15, 1810.Democratic-Republican hold.Successor seated at the beginning of the Congress.New member was also elected by the same ballot to finish the current term, see above.
| nowrap | 

|-
! 
| John Montgomery
|  | Democratic-Republican
| 1806
|  | Incumbent resigned April 29, 1811 to become Attorney General of Maryland.New member elected October 2, 1811.Democratic-Republican hold.Successor seated November 4, 1811.
| nowrap | 

|-
! 
| Joseph B. Varnum
|  | Democratic-Republican
| 1795
|  | Incumbent resigned June 29, 1811 when elected U.S. senator.New member elected November 4, 1811.Democratic-Republican hold.Successor seated January 22, 1812.
| nowrap | ::

|}

Connecticut 

|-
! rowspan=7 | 
| Lewis B. Sturges
|  | Federalist
| 1805 
| Incumbent re-elected.
| rowspan=7 nowrap | 

|-
| Jonathan O. Moseley
|  | Federalist
| 1804
| Incumbent re-elected.

|-
| Benjamin Tallmadge
|  | Federalist
| 1801 
| Incumbent re-elected.

|-
| Epaphroditus Champion
|  | Federalist
| 1806
| Incumbent re-elected.

|-
| Timothy Pitkin
|  | Federalist
| 1805 
| Incumbent re-elected.

|-
| Samuel W. Dana
|  | Federalist
| 1796 
|  | Incumbent resigned in May 1810 after election as U.S. senator.New member elected.Federalist hold.Successor (Law) was not elected to finish the current term, see above.

|-
| John Davenport
|  | Federalist
| 1798
| Incumbent re-elected.

|}

Delaware 

|-
! 
| Nicholas Van Dyke
|  | Federalist
| 1807 
|  | Incumbent retired.New member elected.Federalist hold.
| nowrap | 

|}

Georgia 

|-
! rowspan=4 | 
| William W. Bibb
|  | Democratic-Republican
| 1806
| Incumbent re-elected.
| rowspan=4 nowrap | 

|-
| George Troup
|  | Democratic-Republican
| 1806
| Incumbent re-elected.

|-
| Howell Cobb
|  | Democratic-Republican
| 1806
| Incumbent re-elected.

|-
| Dennis Smelt
|  | Democratic-Republican
| 1806 
|  | Incumbent retired.New member elected.Democratic-Republican hold.

|}

Indiana Territory 
See Non-voting delegates, below.

Kentucky 

|-
! 
| Matthew Lyon
|  | Democratic-Republican
| 1797 1803
|  | Incumbent lost re-election.New member elected.Democratic-Republican hold.
| nowrap | 

|-
! 
| Samuel McKee
|  | Democratic-Republican
| 1808
| Incumbent re-elected.
| nowrap | 

|-
! 
| Henry Crist
|  | Democratic-Republican
| 1808
|  | Incumbent retired.New member elected.Democratic-Republican hold.
| nowrap | 

|-
! 
| Richard M. Johnson
|  | Democratic-Republican
| 1806
| Incumbent re-elected.
| nowrap | 

|-
! 
| Benjamin Howard
|  | Democratic-Republican
| 1806
|  | Incumbent resigned April 10, 1810 to become Governor of Louisiana Territory.New member elected.Democratic-Republican hold.Successor was not a candidate to finish the current term, see above.
| nowrap | 

|-
! 
| Joseph Desha
|  | Democratic-Republican
| 1806
| Incumbent re-elected.
| nowrap | 

|}

Maryland 

Maryland held its elections October 1, 1810.

|-
! 
| John Campbell
|  | Federalist
| 1801
|  | Incumbent retired.New member elected.Federalist hold.
| nowrap | 

|-
! 
| Archibald Van Horne
|  | Democratic-Republican
| 1806
|  | Incumbent retired.New member elected.Democratic-Republican hold.
| nowrap | 

|-
! 
| Philip Barton Key
|  | Federalist
| 1806
| Incumbent re-elected.
| nowrap | 

|-
! 
| Roger Nelson
|  | Democratic-Republican
| 1804 
|  | Incumbent resigned May 14, 1810 to become associate judge of the fifth judicial circuit of Maryland.New member elected.Democratic-Republican hold.Successor also elected to finish the current term, see above.
| nowrap | 

|-
! rowspan=2 | 
| Nicholas R. Moore
|  | Democratic-Republican
| 1803
|  | Incumbent lost re-election.New member elected.Democratic-Republican hold.
| rowspan=2 nowrap | 

|-
| Alexander McKim
|  | Democratic-Republican
| 1808
| Incumbent re-elected.

|-
! 
| John Montgomery
|  | Democratic-Republican
| 1806
| Incumbent re-elected.
| nowrap | 

|-
! 
| John Brown
|  | Democratic-Republican
| 1808
| Incumbent re-elected but declined the seat and resigned, leading to a special election.
| nowrap | 

|-
! 
| Charles Goldsborough
|  | Federalist
| 1804
| Incumbent re-elected.
| nowrap | 

|}

Massachusetts 

Massachusetts held its elections November 5, 1810. Massachusetts law required a majority for election.  This was not met in the  necessitating a second election on April 1, 1811.

|-
! 
| Josiah Quincy
|  | Federalist
| 1804
| Incumbent re-elected.
| nowrap | 

|-
! 
| Benjamin Pickman Jr.
|  | Federalist
| 1808
|  | Incumbent retired.New member elected.Federalist hold.
| nowrap | 

|-
! 
| Edward St. Loe Livermore
|  | Federalist
| 1806
|  | Incumbent retired.New member elected.Federalist hold.
| nowrap | 

|-
! 
| Joseph Bradley Varnum
|  | Democratic-Republican
| 1794
| Incumbent re-elected.
| nowrap | 

|-
! 
| William Ely
|  | Federalist
| 1804
| Incumbent re-elected.
| nowrap | 

|-
! 
| Samuel Taggart
|  | Federalist
| 1803
| Incumbent re-elected.
| nowrap | 

|-
! 
| Charles Turner Jr.
|  | Democratic-Republican
| 1808
| Incumbent re-elected.
| nowrap | 

|-
! 
| Gideon Gardner
|  | Democratic-Republican
| 1808
|  | Incumbent retired.New member elected.Democratic-Republican hold.
| nowrap | 

|-
! 
| Laban Wheaton
|  | Federalist
| 1808
| Incumbent re-elected.
| nowrap | 

|-
! 
| Joseph Allen
|  | Federalist
| 1810 
|  | Incumbent retired.New member elected.Federalist hold.
| nowrap | 

|-
! 
| Abijah Bigelow
|  | Federalist
| 1810 
| Incumbent re-elected.
| nowrap | 

|-
! 
| Ezekiel Bacon
|  | Democratic-Republican
| 1807 
| Incumbent re-elected.
| nowrap | 

|-
! 
| Ebenezer Seaver
|  | Democratic-Republican
| 1803
| Incumbent re-elected.
| nowrap | 

|-
! 
| Richard Cutts
|  | Democratic-Republicans
| 1801
| Incumbent re-elected.
| nowrap | 

|-
! 
| Ezekiel Whitman
|  | Federalist
| 1808
|  | Incumbent lost re-election.New member elected.Democratic-Republican gain.
| nowrap | ::

|-
! 
| Orchard Cook
|  | Democratic-Republican
| 1804
|  | Incumbent retired.New member elected.Democratic-Republican hold.
| nowrap | 

|-
! 
| Barzillai Gannett
|  | Democratic-Republican
| 1808
| Incumbent re-elected.
| nowrap | 

|}

Mississippi Territory 
See Non-voting delegates, below.

New Hampshire 

New Hampshire law required a candidate to receive votes from a majority of voters (10%). In the initial election, only two candidates won a majority, so a second election was held in April 1811 for the remaining three seats, after the congressional term began but before the Congress formally convened.  The data from the source used give majorities to all the top five candidates, suggesting that the data are incomplete.

|-
! rowspan=5 | 
| Daniel Blaisdell
|  | Federalist
| 1808
|  | Incumbent lost re-election.New member elected.Democratic-Republican gain.
| rowspan=5 nowrap | :

|-
| John Curtis Chamberlain
|  | Federalist
| 1808
|  | Incumbent retired.New member elected.Democratic-Republican gain.

|-
| William Hale
|  | Federalist
| 1808
|  | Incumbent lost re-election.New member elected.Democratic-Republican gain.

|-
| Nathaniel Appleton Haven
|  | Federalist
| 1808
|  | Incumbent retired.New member elected.Democratic-Republican gain.

|-
| James Wilson
|  | Federalist
| 1808
|  | Incumbent lost re-election.New member elected.Federalist hold.

|}

New Jersey 

The Federalists ran no official ticket in 1810, but votes were received for various Federalists in some counties.

|-
! rowspan=6 | 
| Adam Boyd
|  | Democratic-Republican
| 18031804 1808 
| Incumbent re-elected.
| rowspan=6 nowrap | 

|-
| Thomas Newbold
|  | Democratic-Republican
| 1806
| Incumbent re-elected.

|-
| William Helms
|  | Democratic-Republican
| 1800
|  | Incumbent retired.New member elected.Federalist hold.

|-
| John A. Scudder
|  | Democratic-Republican
| 1810 
|  | Incumbent retired.New member elected.Federalist hold.

|-
| Henry Southard
|  | Democratic-Republican
| 1800
|  | Incumbent retired.New member elected.Federalist hold.

|-
| Jacob Hufty
|  | Democratic-Republican
| 1808
| Incumbent re-elected.

|}

New York 

|-
! 
| Ebenezer Sage
|  | Democratic-Republican
| 1808
|  | Incumbent re-elected.
| nowrap | 

|-
! rowspan=2 | 
| William Denning
|  | Democratic-Republican
| 1808
|  | Incumbent resigned in 1810.New member elected.Democratic-Republican hold.Successor also elected the same day to finish the current term, see above.
| rowspan=2 nowrap | 
|-
| Gurdon S. Mumford
|  | Democratic-Republican
| 1804 
|  | Incumbent retired.New member elected.Democratic-Republican hold.

|-
! 
| Jonathan Fisk
|  | Democratic-Republican
| 1808
|  | Incumbent retired.New member elected.Democratic-Republican hold.
| nowrap | 

|-
! 
| James Emott
|  | Federalist
| 1808
| Incumbent re-elected.
| nowrap | 

|-
! 
| Barent Gardenier
|  | Federalist
| 1806
|  | Incumbent retired.New member elected.Democratic-Republican gain.
| nowrap | 

|-
! rowspan=2 | 
| Herman Knickerbocker
|  | Federalist
| 1808
|  | Incumbent retired.New member elected.Federalist hold.
| rowspan=2 nowrap | 

|-
| Robert Le Roy Livingston
|  | Federalist
| 1808
| Incumbent re-elected.

|-
! 
| Killian Van Rensselaer
|  | Federalist
| 1800
|  | Incumbent retired.New member elected.Federalist hold.
| nowrap | 

|-
! 
| John Thompson
|  | Democratic-Republican
| 1806
|  | Incumbent retired.New member elected.Democratic-Republican hold.
| nowrap | 

|-
! 
| Thomas Sammons
|  | Federalist
| 1808
|  | Incumbent re-elected in a different party.Democratic-Republican gain.
| nowrap | 

|-
! 
| John Nicholson
|  | Democratic-Republican
| 1808
|  | Incumbent retired.New member elected.Democratic-Republican hold.
| nowrap | 

|-
! 
| Thomas R. Gold
|  | Federalist
| 1808
| Incumbent re-elected.
| nowrap | 

|-
! 
| Erastus Root
|  | Democratic-Republican
| 1808
|  | Incumbent retired.New member elected.Democratic-Republican hold.
| nowrap | 

|-
! 
| Uri Tracy
|  | Democratic-Republican
| 1808
| Incumbent re-elected.
| nowrap | 

|-
! 
| Vincent Mathews
|  | Federalist
| 1808
|  | Incumbent retired.New member elected.Democratic-Republican gain.
| nowrap | 

|-
! 
| Peter B. Porter
|  | Democratic-Republican
| 1808
| Incumbent re-elected.
| nowrap | 

|}

North Carolina 

|-
! 
| Lemuel Sawyer
|  | Democratic-Republican
| 1806
| Incumbent re-elected.
| nowrap | 

|-
! 
| Willis Alston
|  | Democratic-Republican
| 1798
| Incumbent re-elected.
| nowrap | 

|-
! 
| William Kennedy
|  | Democratic-Republican
| 18031804 (Lost re-election)1808
|  | Incumbent retired.New member elected.Democratic-Republican hold.
| nowrap | 

|-
! 
| John Stanly
|  | Federalist
| 18001803 (Lost re-election)1808
|  | Incumbent retired.New member elected.Democratic-Republican gain.
| nowrap | 

|-
! 
| Thomas Kenan
|  | Democratic-Republican
| 1805 
|  | Incumbent retired.New member elected.Democratic-Republican hold.
| nowrap | 

|-
! 
| Nathaniel Macon
|  | Democratic-Republican
| 1791
| Incumbent re-elected.
| nowrap | 

|-
! 
| Archibald McBryde
|  | Federalist
| 1808
| Incumbent re-elected.
| nowrap | 

|-
! 
| Richard Stanford
|  | Democratic-Republican
| 1796
| Incumbent re-elected.
| nowrap | 

|-
! 
| James Cochran
|  | Democratic-Republican
| 1808
| Incumbent re-elected.
| nowrap | 

|-
! 
| Joseph Pearson
|  | Federalist
| 1808
| Incumbent re-elected.
| nowrap | 

|-
! 
| James Holland
|  | Democratic-Republican
| 1800
|  | Incumbent retired.New member elected.Democratic-Republican hold.
| nowrap | 

|-
! 
| Meshack Franklin
|  | Democratic-Republican
| 1806
| Incumbent re-elected.
| nowrap | 

|}

Ohio 

This was the last election in which Ohio had a single .  Due to rapid population growth in the state, the at-large district had become disproportionately populous by this point.

|-
! 
| Jeremiah Morrow
|  | Democratic-Republican
| 1803
| Incumbent re-elected.
| nowrap | 

|}

Pennsylvania 

|-
! rowspan=3 | 
| Adam Seybert
|  | Democratic-Republican
| 1809 
| Incumbent re-elected.
| rowspan=3 nowrap | 

|-
| William Anderson
|  | Democratic-Republican
| 1808
| Incumbent re-elected.

|-
| John Porter
|  | Democratic-Republican
| 1806
|  | Incumbent lost re-election.New member elected.Federalist gain.

|-
! rowspan=3 | 
| Robert Brown
|  | Democratic-Republican
| 1798 
| Incumbent re-elected.
| rowspan=3 nowrap | 

|-
| William Milnor
|  | Federalist
| 1806
|  | Incumbent lost re-election.New member elected.Democratic-Republican gain.

|-
| John Ross
|  | Democratic-Republican
| 1808
|  | Incumbent retired.New member elected.Democratic-Republican hold.

|-
! rowspan=3 | 
| Robert Jenkins
|  | Federalist
| 1806
|  | Incumbent retired.New member elected.Democratic-Republican gain.
| rowspan=3 nowrap | 

|-
| Matthias Richards
|  | Democratic-Republican
| 1806
|  | Incumbent retired.New member elected.Democratic-Republican hold.

|-
| Daniel Hiester
|  | Democratic-Republican
| 1808
|  | Incumbent lost re-election.New member elected.Democratic-Republican hold.

|-
! rowspan=2 | 
| Robert Whitehill
|  | Democratic-Republican
| 1805 
| Incumbent re-elected.
| rowspan=2 nowrap | 

|-
| David Bard
|  | Democratic-Republican
| 1802
| Incumbent re-elected.

|-
! 
| George Smith
|  | Democratic-Republican
| 1808
| Incumbent re-elected.
| nowrap | 

|-
! 
| William Crawford
|  | Democratic-Republican
| 1808
| Incumbent re-elected.
| nowrap | 

|-
! 
| John Rea
|  | Democratic-Republican
| 1802
|  | Incumbent lost re-election.New member elected.Democratic-Republican hold.
| nowrap | 

|-
! 
| William Findley
|  | Democratic-Republican
| 1802
| Incumbent re-elected.
| nowrap | 

|-
! 
| John Smilie
|  | Democratic-Republican
| 17921794 1798
| Incumbent re-elected.
| nowrap | 

|-
! 
| Aaron Lyle
|  | Democratic-Republican
| 1808
| Incumbent re-elected.
| nowrap | 

|-
! 
| Samuel Smith
|  | Democratic-Republican
| 1805 
|  | Incumbent lost re-election.New member elected.Democratic-Republican hold.
| nowrap | 

|}

Rhode Island 

|-
| rowspan=2|
| Richard Jackson Jr.
|  | Federalist
| 1808
| Incumbent re-elected.
| rowspan=2 nowrap | 

|-
| Elisah R. Potter
|  | Federalist
| 1808
| Incumbent re-elected.

|}

South Carolina 

|-
! 
| Robert Marion
|  | Democratic-Republican
| 1804
|  | Incumbent retired.New member elected.Democratic-Republican hold.Incumbent then resigned December 4, 1810 and successor was also elected to finish the current term, see above.
| nowrap | 

|-
! 
| William Butler Sr.
|  | Democratic-Republican
| 1800
| Incumbent re-elected.
| nowrap | 

|-
! 
| Robert Witherspoon
|  | Democratic-Republican
| 1808
|  | Incumbent retired.New member elected.Democratic-Republican hold.
| nowrap | 

|-
! 
| John Taylor
|  | Democratic-Republican
| 1806
|  | Incumbent lost re-election.New member elected.Democratic-Republican hold.
| nowrap | 

|-
! 
| Richard Winn
|  | Democratic-Republican
| 1802 
| Incumbent re-elected.
| nowrap | 

|-
! 
| Joseph Calhoun
|  | Democratic-Republican
| 1807 
|  | Incumbent retired.New member elected.Democratic-Republican hold.
| nowrap | 

|-
! 
| Thomas Moore
|  | Democratic-Republican
| 1800
| Incumbent re-elected.
| nowrap | 

|-
! 
| Lemuel J. Alston
|  | Democratic-Republican
| 1806
|  | Incumbent retired.New member elected.Democratic-Republican hold.
| nowrap | 

|}

Tennessee 

|-
! 
| John Rhea
|  | Democratic-Republican
| 1803
| Incumbent re-elected.
| nowrap | 

|-
! 
| Robert Weakley
|  | Democratic-Republican
| 1809
|  | Incumbent retired.New member elected.Democratic-Republican hold.
| nowrap | 

|-
! 
| Pleasant M. Miller
|  | Democratic-Republican
| 1809
|  | Incumbent retired.New member elected.Democratic-Republican hold.
| nowrap | 

|}

Vermont 

|-
! 
| Samuel Shaw
|  | Democratic-Republican
| 1808
| Incumbent re-elected.
| nowrap | 

|-
! 
| Jonathan H. Hubbard
|  | Federalist
| 1808
|  | Incumbent lost re-election.New member elected.Democratic-Republican gain.
| nowrap | 

|-
! 
| William Chamberlain
|  | Federalist
| 18021805 1808
|  | Incumbent lost re-election.New member elected.Democratic-Republican gain.
| nowrap | 

|-
! 
| Martin Chittenden
|  | Federalist
| 1803
| Incumbent re-elected.
| nowrap | 

|}

Virginia  

|-
! 
| William McKinley
|  | Democratic-Republican
| 1810 
|  | Incumbent lost re-election.New member elected.Federalist gain.
| nowrap | 

|-
! 
| James Stephenson
|  | Federalist
| 1809
|  | Incumbent retired.New member elected.Federalist hold.
| nowrap | 

|-
! 
| John Smith
|  | Democratic-Republican
| 1801
| Incumbent re-elected.
| nowrap | 

|-
! 
| Jacob Swoope
|  | Federalist
| 1809
|  | Incumbent retired.New member elected.Democratic-Republican gain.
| nowrap | 

|-
! 
| James Breckinridge
|  | Federalist
| 1809
| Incumbent re-elected.
| nowrap | 

|-
! 
| Daniel Sheffey
|  | Federalist
| 1809
| Incumbent re-elected.
| nowrap | 

|-
! rowspan=2 | 
| Joseph Lewis Jr.
|  | Federalist
| 1803
| Incumbent re-elected.
| rowspan=2 | nowrap | 
|-
| John Love
|  | Democratic-Republican
| 1807
|  | Incumbent lost re-election.Democratic-Republican loss.

|-
! 
| Walter Jones
|  | Democratic-Republican
| 1803
|  | Incumbent retired.New member elected.Democratic-Republican hold.John Taliaferro (Democratic-Republican), was seated on December 2, 1811 after successfully challenging the election in the House Committee on Elections.
| nowrap | 

|-
! 
| colspan=3 | Open seat
|  | Open seat.New member elected.Democratic-Republican gain.
| nowrap | 

|-
! 
| John Dawson
|  | Democratic-Republican
| 1797
| Incumbent re-elected.
| nowrap | 

|-
! 
| John Roane
|  | Democratic-Republican
| 1809
| Incumbent re-elected.
| nowrap | 

|-
! 
| Burwell Bassett
|  | Democratic-Republican
| 1805
| Incumbent re-elected.
| nowrap | 

|-
! 
| William A. Burwell
|  | Democratic-Republican
| 1806 
| Incumbent re-elected.
| nowrap | 

|-
! 
| Matthew Clay
|  | Democratic-Republican
| 1797
| Incumbent re-elected.
| nowrap | 

|-
! rowspan=2 | 
| John Randolph
|  | Democratic-Republican
| 1799
| Incumbent re-elected.
| rowspan=2 nowrap | 
|-
| John W. Eppes
|  | Democratic-Republican
| 1807
|  | Incumbent lost re-election.Democratic-Republican loss.

|-
! 
| colspan=3 | Open seat
|  | Open seat.New member elected.Democratic-Republican gain.
| nowrap | 

|-
! 
| Thomas Gholson Jr.
|  | Democratic-Republican
| 1808 
| Incumbent re-elected.
| nowrap | 

|-
! 
| Peterson Goodwyn
|  | Democratic-Republican
| 1803
| Incumbent re-elected.
| nowrap | 

|-
! 
| Edwin Gray
|  | Democratic-Republican
| 1799
| Incumbent re-elected.
| nowrap | 

|-
! 
| Thomas Newton Jr.
|  | Democratic-Republican
| 1799
| Incumbent re-elected.
| nowrap | 

|-
! 
| David S. Garland
|  | Democratic-Republican
| 1809 
|  | Incumbent retired.New member elected.Democratic-Republican hold.
| nowrap | 

|-
! 
| John Clopton
|  | Democratic-Republican
| 1801
| Incumbent re-elected.
| nowrap | 

|}

Non-voting delegates 

There were five territories with the right to send non-voting delegates to the 12th Congress.  Two of them, Illinois Territory and Missouri Territory elected their first representative near the end of the 12th Congress in 1812, while Orleans Territory's seat remained vacant until the territory was admitted as the State of Louisiana.

|-
! 
| Jonathan Jennings
|  | None
| 1809
| Incumbent re-elected.
| nowrap | 

|-
! 
| George Poindexter
|  | None
| 1806
| Incumbent re-elected.
| nowrap | 

|}

See also
 1810 United States elections
 List of United States House of Representatives elections (1789–1822)
 1810–11 United States Senate elections
 11th United States Congress
 12th United States Congress

Notes

References

Bibliography

External links
 Office of the Historian (Office of Art & Archives, Office of the Clerk, U.S. House of Representatives)